Harry Gardner  (12 June 1890 – 12 February 1939) was an English first-class cricketer and British Army officer. Gardner served in the Royal Artillery for over twenty years, during which he was decorated with the Military Cross, Croix de Guerre and the Order of the Nile. He also played first-class cricket for the British Army cricket team.

Life and military career
Gardner was born at the City of London and was educated at The King's School, Canterbury. From there he attended the Royal Military Academy, Woolwich, graduating in July 1910 as a  second lieutenant in the Royal Artillery. He was promoted to the rank of lieutenant in July 1913. Gardner made two appearances in first-class cricket for the British Army cricket team in June 1914, against Cambridge University at Fenner's and the Royal Navy at Lord's. He scored 42 runs in his two first-class matches, with a high score of 17.

He served in the First World War, during which he was promoted to the temporary rank of captain in July 1915. He relinquished a temporary appointment to brigade major–captain in March 1919. In June of the same year, he was awarded the Military Cross and decorated with the Croix de Guerre by France. He was granted the Order of the Nile (fourth class) in May 1922, for operations against the Nuer leader Garluark in the Upper Nile. Having been seconded to the Royal Military College of Science, Gardner was restored to the Royal Artillery in April 1928. He was promoted to the rank of major in December 1928. He retired from active service in March 1931. Gardner died at East Grinstead in February 1939.

References

External links

1890 births
1939 deaths
People from the City of London
People educated at The King's School, Canterbury
Graduates of the Royal Military Academy, Woolwich
Royal Artillery officers
English cricketers
British Army cricketers
British Army personnel of World War I
Recipients of the Military Cross
Recipients of the Croix de Guerre 1914–1918 (France)
Military personnel from London